Eugoa uniformis is a moth of the family Erebidae first described by Jeremy Daniel Holloway in 2001. It is found on Borneo. The habitat consists of lowland forests, including secondary forests.

The forewings are speckled brown and the hindwings are greyish brown in both sexes.

References

Moths described in 2001
uniformis